Senate Bill 151, also known as SB 151, is a pension bill passed on March 29, 2018 by the Kentucky Senate and the Kentucky House of Representatives. The bill includes increases for cost of living, ends the inviolable contract for new teachers hired after January 1, 2019, and requires employees hired between 2003 and 2008 to pay an additional 1 percent of their pay for health care benefits in retirement. The bill received numerous criticism, especially from teachers. The bill was overturned on December 13, 2018 by the Kentucky Supreme Court as unconstitutional, which prevented the bill from going into effect on January 1, 2019.

Legislative history
Senate Bill 151 was introduced in the Senate on February 15, 2018. On March 29, 2018, it was passed by the Kentucky Senate by a vote of 22–15 and the Kentucky House with a vote of 49–46. The bill was sent to Kentucky Governor Matt Bevin’s desk. It was received by Kentucky Secretary of State Alison Lundergan Grimes, and signed by Bevin on April 10, 2018. On December 13, 2018, the Kentucky Supreme Court struck down SB 151 as unconstitutional, resulting in the bill never taking effect.

Opposition to SB 151
The decision to pass Senate Bill 151 on March 29, 2018 sparked outrage from teachers across Kentucky. As a result, schools in 25 counties closed on March 30, 2018. Teachers rallied in Frankfort to protest the bill and chanted phrases such as "120 strong" and "united we stand, divided we fall." On June 20, 2018, Franklin Circuit Judge Phillip Shepherd ruled the bill as unconstitutional and stated that the legislature violated Section 46 of the Constitution by failing to give the bill three readings on three separate days in each chamber.

Lawsuit filed by Andy Beshear
After SB 151 was passed, Kentucky Attorney General Andy Beshear announced his intentions to file a lawsuit to stop the bill. On April 11, 2018, Beshear, the Kentucky Education Association and the Kentucky State Lodge Fraternal Order of Police filed a lawsuit against Bevin and other lawmakers following the decision to sign the bill. Bevin responded by filing a motion to dismiss Beshear from the lawsuit for conflicts of interest. On April 25, 2018, Bevin’s request to disqualify Beshear was denied by the Franklin Circuit Court. 

Bevin called for Phillip Shepherd to step down, as well as referring to him as a "hack", but the judge refused to step down. Bevin’s request to dismiss Shepherd was denied by the Kentucky Supreme Court on June 6. On June 13, Bevin filed a amended petition, but was denied on July 11. On August 10, 2018, the Kentucky Supreme Court announced that September 20, 2018 would be the date for hearing the case. On September 20, the case was taken to court. On December 13, 2018, the Supreme Court ruled against SB 151 on grounds that the bill did not receive the required three days of public readings, as mandated by the Kentucky Constitution. This ruling handed Beshear a victory over Bevin.

Reactions to Supreme Court decision
After the Kentucky Supreme Court ruled SB 151 unconstitutional, the decision received praise from the Kentucky Public Pension Coalition and the Kentucky Democratic Party, and criticism by the Kentucky Republican Party. Justice Daniel J. Venters wrote that the bill did not comply with the requirements established in the constitution. Teachers celebrated the decision and called it a "win for democracy". However, Matt Bevin criticized the decision as "unprecedented power grab by activist judges".

See also
Education in Kentucky

References

2018 controversies in the United States
Politics of Kentucky
2018 in American law
Kentucky law
2018 in education